The French Marshal Jean Le Maingre ("Boucicaut") was a knight who fought throughout Europe. Saracens refrained from attacking Boucicaut in Tunis when two "beautiful women in white robes fell from heaven with, into their hands, a flag with a red cross."

In memory of this event, which he considered divine intervention, Boucicaut founded the "Order of the White Lady" around 1400.  Boucicaut founded the order so that the knights "could always support the weaker sex."

Like many of the fourteenth and fifteenth century orders, this order did not long exist.

See also

Emprise de l'Escu vert à la Dame Blanche

Sources 
 "Libre des faits de Boucicaut" issued in 1620 by Theodore Godefroy.

White Lady